Ikot Esenam is a town located in Oruk Anam Local Government Area. It is among the major towns of the Abak/Midim Clan both in the region of Akwa Ibom State and the southern region of Nigeria. 

Ikot Esenam has strong historical background ranging from their outstanding scholars of old. People like Brendan Udo Umoren  makes a significant contribution to the development and advancement of the people Ikot Esenam and till this day, his legacy is evergreen in the minds of the people Ikot Esenam.  

Towns in Oruk Anam